The following is a list of notable deaths in September 2020.

Entries for each day are listed alphabetically by surname. A typical entry lists information in the following sequence:
 Name, age, country of citizenship at birth, subsequent country of citizenship (if applicable), reason for notability, cause of death (if known), and reference.

September 2020

1
Wick Allison, 72, American magazine publisher (National Review, The American Conservative) and author, bladder cancer.
Nada Birko, 89, Croatian Olympic skier (1952).
Joseph H. Connell, 96, American ecologist.
Edwin M. Cronk, 102, American diplomat, Ambassador to Singapore (1972–1975).
Délio dos Santos, 95, Brazilian pro-democracy lawyer and politician, Deputy (1979–1987), pneumonia.
Shekhar Gawli, 45, Indian cricketer (Maharashtra), fall.
Melanie Wade Goodwin, 50, American politician, member of the North Carolina House of Representatives (2005–2011), cancer.
Shanna Hogan, 37, American author, drowned.
Sheila Ingram, 63, American Olympic runner, silver medallist (1976).
James Jackson, 76, American social psychologist.
Jimmy Janes, 73, American comic book artist (Legion of Super-Heroes) and animator (Teenage Mutant Ninja Turtles, X-Men: The Animated Series).
Dianne Kirksey, 69–70, American actress and director.
Boris Klyuyev, 76, Russian actor (D'Artagnan and Three Musketeers, The Adventures of Sherlock Holmes and Dr. Watson, TASS Is Authorized to Declare...), People's Artist (2002), lung cancer.
Vladislav Krapivin, 81, Russian children's author, pneumonia.
François Lalande, 89, Algerian-born French actor (Herbie Goes to Monte Carlo, French Postcards, Dangerous Liaisons).
Moose Lallo, 95, Canadian ice hockey player (Muskegon Zephyrs, Grand Rapids Rockets, Washington Presidents).
Erick Morillo, 49, American DJ (Reel 2 Real), music producer and record label owner, acute ketamine toxicity.
John Najarian, 92, American transplant surgeon.
Sue C. Nichols, 55, American animator and screenwriter (The Lion King, The Hunchback of Notre Dame, Aladdin), cancer.
Terje Steen, 76, Norwegian Olympic ice hockey player (1968, 1972), national team.
Thomas L. Steffen, 90, American jurist, Justice (1982–1997) and Chief Justice (1995–1997) of the Supreme Court of Nevada.
Jerzy Szczakiel, 71, Polish speedway rider, world champion (1973).
James A. Taylor, 92, Canadian politician, Ontario MPP (1971–1987).

2
Abdúl Aramayo, 86, Bolivian footballer (Chaco Petrolero, Bolívar, national team).
Georges Azenstarck, 85–86, French photographer.
Danie Brits, 55, South African professional wrestler, heart attack.
David Capel, 57, English cricketer (Northamptonshire, national team), brain tumour.
Albert Cheesebrough, 85, English footballer (Burnley, Leicester City, Port Vale).
Philippe Daverio, 70, French-born Italian art critic, gallerist, academic, and television presenter, cancer.
Fred Davies, 81, English football player (Wolverhampton Wanderers, Bournemouth) and manager (Shrewsbury Town), idiopathic pulmonary fibrosis.
Stephen M. Drance, 95, Canadian ophthalmologist.
Datta Ekbote, 84, Indian activist and politician, mayor of Pune, COVID-19.
David Evans, 95, Australian RAAF Air Marshal, Chief of the Air Staff (1982–1985).
M. J. Appaji Gowda, 69, Indian politician, Karnataka MLC (2013–2018), COVID-19.
David Graeber, 59, American anthropologist and author (Bullshit Jobs, Debt: The First 5000 Years, The Utopia of Rules), internal bleeding.
Ted Halstead, 52, American climatologist and author, fall.
Clyde H. Hamilton, 86, American jurist, Judge of the D.S.C. (1981–1991) and Judge of the U.S. Court of Appeals for the Fourth Circuit (since 1991).
Rinat Ibragimov, 59, Russian double bass player, COVID-19.
Irving Kanarek, 100, American defense attorney (Charles Manson, Jimmy Lee Smith).
Kang Kek Iew, 77, Cambodian internal security leader (Tuol Sleng, Santebal) and convicted war criminal, lung disease.
Christian Liaigre, 77, French architect and interior designer.
Esther McCready, 89, American nurse.
Ismail Molla, 82, Greek politician, MP (1989–1990), stroke.
Maria Celeste Nardini, 77, Italian politician.
Carol Braun Pasternack, 70, American literary historian, brain cancer.
Ramkrishna Baba Patil, 84, Indian politician, MP (1998–2004) and Maharashtra MLA (1985–1995), complications from diabetes.
Mark Prent, 72, Canadian-American sculptor, aortic aneurysm.
Agustín Roberto Radrizzani, 75, Argentine Roman Catholic prelate, Bishop of Neuquén (1991–2001) and Lomas de Zamora (2001–2007), Archbishop of Mercedes-Luján (2007–2019), COVID-19.
Serara Selelo-Mogwe, 93, Botswana nurse and academic.
Wanda Seux, 72, Paraguayan-Argentine-Mexican vedette and actress (La vida difícil de una mujer fácil, Spicy Chile, Paradas Contínuas), complications from multiple strokes.
John Shrapnell, 85, British-born New Zealand journalist, actor and singer.
Adrianus Johannes Simonis, 88, Dutch Roman Catholic cardinal, Archbishop of Utrecht (1983–2007).
Norman J. W. Thrower, 100, English-born American cartographer and scholar.
František Vaněk, 88, Czech Olympic ice hockey player (1956, 1960).
John Yates, 90, English footballer (Chester).
William Yorzyk, 87, American Hall of Fame swimmer, Olympic champion (1956).
Dave Zeller, 81, American basketball player (Cincinnati Royals).

3
Kathleen Byerly, 76, American U.S Navy captain, cancer.
Betty Caywood, 89, American sportscaster (Kansas City Athletics).
Michael J. Cleary, 95, Irish Roman Catholic prelate, Bishop of Banjul (1981–2006).
Antônio de Jesus Dias, 78, Brazilian pastor and politician, Deputy (1987–1991, 1991–1993), COVID-19.
Alércio Dias, 77, Brazilian lawyer and politician, Deputy (1983–1991), gastrointestinal complications.
Dito, 58, Portuguese football player (Braga, Benfica, national team) and manager, heart attack.
Bernard Edelman, 82, French jurist, lawyer, and philosopher.
Karel Knesl, 78, Czech footballer (Dukla Prague, Slavia Prague, Czechoslovakia national team), Olympic silver medallist (1964).
Dorothea Liebermann-Meffert, 90, German surgeon.
Mary Marzke, 83, American anthropologist.
Jean-François Poron, 84, French actor (The Air of Paris, A Captain's Honor).
Bill Pursell, 94, American composer ("Our Winter Love"), pianist and music teacher, COVID-19.
Ahmed Al-Qadri, 64, Syrian agricultural engineer, Minister of Agriculture and Agrarian Reform (2013–2020), COVID-19.
Gianni Serra, 86, Italian film director and screenwriter.
*Félix Suárez Colomo, 69, Spanish Olympic racing cyclist (1972).
Reinhard Theimer, 72, German Olympic hammer thrower (1968, 1972).
Birol Ünel, 59, Turkish-born German actor (Head-On, Transylvania, Enemy at the Gates), cancer.

4
Vince Agro, 83, Canadian politician and novelist.
Bryan Anderson, 78, Canadian politician.
Ajibade Babalade, 48, Nigerian footballer (Shooting Stars, national team), cardiac arrest.
Sir Simon Boyle, 79, British business executive and public servant, Lord Lieutenant of Gwent (2001–2016).
Lloyd Cadena, 26, Filipino YouTuber, COVID-19.
Mike Cooley, 86, Irish engineer and trade unionist.
Annie Cordy, 92, Belgian actress (Victor and Victoria, Ces dames s'en mêlent, Souvenir of Gibraltar) and singer, cardiac arrest.
Peter Cronjé, 70, South African rugby union player (Golden Lions, national team), cancer.
Gregory de Vink, 22, South African racing cyclist, traffic collision.
Leon Finney Jr., 82, American minister and community organizer.
Andrzej Gawroński, 85, Polish actor (Everything for Sale, How I Unleashed World War II, A Short Film About Killing).
Nandi Glassie, 69, Cook Islands politician, MP (2006–2018), cancer.
Gary Peacock, 85, American jazz double-bassist.
Curtis S. Person Jr., 85, American politician, member of the Tennessee House of Representatives (1966–1968) and Senate (1968–2006).
Betty Petryna, 89, Canadian baseball player (Grand Rapids Chicks, Fort Wayne Daisies).
Pierre Sidos, 93, French neo-Pétainist and political activist, founder of Jeune Nation.
Lucille Starr, 82, Canadian singer ("Cajun Love").
Dmitry Svetushkin, 40, Moldovan chess grandmaster, suicide by jumping.
Carl-Henning Wijkmark, 85, Swedish novelist (Stundande natten).
Joe Williams, 85, Cook Islands politician, Prime Minister (1999), Minister of Foreign Affairs (1999) and MP (1994–2004), COVID-19.

5
Dwight Anderson, 59, American basketball player (Denver Nuggets, Albuquerque Silvers, Evansville Thunder).
Johnny Bakshi, 88, Indian film producer, director (Raavan, Khudai) and actor, heart attack.
Orlando Bauzon, 75, Filipino Olympic basketball player (1968), cardiac arrest.
Rich Buzin, 74, American football player (New York Giants, Los Angeles Rams).
Zelmar Casco, 94, Argentine Olympic fencer (1964).
Francis Chapman, 97, Canadian cinematographer and television director.
Abu Osman Chowdhury, 85, Bangladeshi resistance fighter (Mukti Bahini).
Žarko Domljan, 87, Croatian politician, Speaker of the Parliament (1990–1992).
Smokey Gaines, 80, American basketball player (Kentucky Colonels) and coach (Detroit Titans, San Diego State Aztecs), cancer.
Marian Jaworski, 94, Polish Roman Catholic cardinal, Archbishop of Lviv of the Latins (1991–2008).
Mohamed Haytham Khayat, 83, Syrian physician and lexicographer.
Jimmy Lavin, 92, Irish Gaelic footballer and hurler.
Rodney Litchfield, 81, English actor (Early Doors, Coronation Street, Testimony).
Thandeka Mdeliswa, 34, South African actress (Generations: The Legacy, Isidingo, Rhythm City), shot.
Jiří Menzel, 82, Czech director, actor and screenwriter (Closely Watched Trains, My Sweet Little Village, Larks on a String), Oscar winner (1967).
Steve Merrill, 74, American politician, Governor (1993–1997) and Attorney General of New Hampshire (1985–1989).
Frédéric Musso, 79, Algerian-born French writer and poet.
Brigitte Peskine, 68, French author and screenwriter (Plus belle la vie, Candice Renoir).
Ethan Peters, 17, American beauty influencer, drug overdose.
Malka Ribowska, 89, Polish-born French actress (Sundays and Cybele, The Shameless Old Lady).
Antoine Rufenacht, 81, French politician, mayor of Le Havre (1995–2010), President of the Regional Council of Upper Normandy (1992–1998).
Tam Ping-man, 86, Hong Kong actor (Exiled, Wild City, House of Wolves).
Yousef Wali, 90, Egyptian politician, Minister of Agriculture and Land Reclamation (1982–2004).
David Walter, 80, New Zealand politician, mayor of Stratford (1989–1998), leukaemia.
Al G. Wright, 104, English-born American band director (Purdue All-American Marching Band).

6
Levon Altounian, 84, Lebanese footballer (Homenetmen, national team).
Sergey Belyayev, 60, Kazakh sport shooter, Olympic silver medallist (1996).
Kesavananda Bharati, 79, Indian civil rights activist (Kesavananda Bharati v. State of Kerala).
Joan Blackham, 74, English actress (Bridget Jones's Diary, Judge John Deed, Doctors).
Lou Brock, 81, American Hall of Fame baseball player (Chicago Cubs, St. Louis Cardinals).
Marco Cariola, 87, Chilean cattle farmer, lawyer and politician, Senator (1998–2006).
Paul Chittilapilly, 86, Indian Syro-Malabar Catholic hierarch, Bishop of Kalyan (1988–1996) and Thamarassery (1996–2010).
Achmat Dangor, 71, South African author and political activist.
Nancy Dine, 83, American filmmaker (Jim Dine: A Self-Portrait on the Walls), lung cancer.
Kevin Dobson, 77, American actor (Kojak, Knots Landing, Midway), heart attack.
Christiane Eda-Pierre, 88, French coloratura soprano.
Lennart Forsberg, 92, Swedish footballer (GIF Sundsvall, Djurgården).
George Carr Frison, 95, American archaeologist.
Bob Fujitani, 98, American comics artist (Flash Gordon, Rip Kirby), co-creator of Solar.
Isabel Gutiérrez de Bosch, 89, Guatemalan businesswoman and philanthropist.
Tom Jernstedt, 75, American Hall of Fame basketball administrator.
Sir Vaughan Jones, 67, New Zealand mathematician (Jones polynomial), Fields Medal winner (1990).
Gavin Keneally, 86, Australian politician, South Australian MHA (1970–1989).
Anita Lindblom, 82, Swedish singer and actress.
Gerry Lynn, 68, American politician, member of the Kentucky House of Representatives (2005–2007).
Sterling Magee, 84, American blues musician, complications from COVID-19.
Col Markham, 80, Australian politician, New South Wales MLA (1988–2003).
Nirvendra Kumar Mishra, 74–76, Indian politician, beaten.
S. Mohinder, 95, Indian composer (Paapi, Nanak Nam Jahaz Hai) and music director.
Dragoljub Ojdanić, 79, Serbian military officer and convicted war criminal, Chief of the General Staff (1998–2000) and Minister of Defence of Yugoslavia (2000).
Mike Sexton, 72, American Hall of Fame poker player and commentator, prostate cancer.
Lotte Strauss, 107, German-born American author.
Takashi Sugimura, 94, Japanese biochemist, heart failure.
Helen Taylor Thompson, 96, British aid worker.
Ethel Soliven Timbol, 80, Filipino journalist (Manila Bulletin).
Dickson Wamwiri, 35, Kenyan Olympic taekwondo practitioner (2008).
Bruce Williamson, 49, American singer (The Temptations), COVID-19.
Kevin Zeese, 64, American lawyer and political activist, heart attack.

7
Berni Alder, 94, German-born American physicist.
Abdul Qadir Bajamal, 74, Yemeni politician, Prime Minister (2001–2007) and Minister of Foreign Affairs (1998–2001), complications from multiple strokes.
Chen Dingchang, 83, Chinese aerospace engineer, member of the Chinese Academy of Sciences.
Abdul Malik Fadjar, 81, Indonesian politician and academic, Minister of Religious Affairs (1998–1999) and Education (2001–2004).
Gao Wenbin, 99, Chinese historian and jurist.
Aurelio Iragorri Hormaza, 83, Colombian politician, Senator (1991–2014), Governor of Cauca (1975–1976) and President of the Chamber of Representatives (1981–1982), COVID-19.
Aida Kamel, 89, Egyptian actress.
Sergey Koltakov, 64, Russian actor (Mirror for a Hero, New Adventures of a Yankee in King Arthur's Court, The Life of Klim Samgin).
Logie Bruce Lockhart, 98, Scottish rugby union player (national team), writer and journalist.
Paul E. Menoher, 81, American lieutenant general.
Tim Mulherin, 63, Australian politician, Queensland MP (1995–2015), cancer.
Xavier Ortiz, 48, Mexican actor (Journey from the Fall, Un gancho al corazón), singer (Garibaldi) and television host, suicide.
Luba Perchyshyn, 96, American folk artist.
André Reichling, 64, Luxembourgian conductor and composer ("The NATO Hymn").
Narendra Kumar Swain, 80, Indian politician, MP (2015–2020).
Govind Swarup, 91, Indian radio astronomer.
Patrick Sweeney, 81, American politician, member of the Ohio House of Representatives (1967–1997) and Senate (1997–1998).
Mir Haji Muhammad Hayat Khan Talpur, 83, Pakistani politician, Sindh MPA (2013–2018).
Patricia Thiel, 67, American chemist and materials scientist.
Luis Zárate, 79, Mexican Olympic cyclist (1960).

8
Sonia Anderson, 76, British archivist, cancer.
Jean-Léon Beauvois, 77, French psychologist.
Gene Budig, 81, American academic and baseball executive, Chancellor of KU (1980–1994), president of WVU (1977–1981) and the American League (1994–1999).
Joseph Chennoth, 76, Indian Syro-Malabar Catholic prelate, Archbishop of Milevum (since 1999) and Apostolic Nuncio to Japan (since 2011).
Héctor Giorgetti, 64, Argentine footballer (Chacarita Juniors, Estudiantes, Club Universidad de Chile).
James Greeno, 85, American psychologist.
Sir Ronald Harwood, 85, South African-born British dramatist and screenwriter (The Pianist, The Dresser, The Diving Bell and the Butterfly), Oscar winner (2003).
Robert L. Lynn, 88, American poet, President of Louisiana College (1975–1997).
Anita Mason, 78, English novelist.
Sally Engle Merry, 75, American anthropologist.
Jim Owens, 86, American baseball player (Philadelphia Phillies, Cincinnati Reds, Houston Colt .45s/Astros).
Claude Peretti, 78, French footballer (Monaco, Ajaccio).
Jaya Prakash Reddy, 73, Indian actor (Samarasimha Reddy, Jayam Manadera, Chennakesava Reddy), cardiac arrest.
Alfred Riedl, 70, Austrian football player (Standard Liège, national team) and manager (Vietnam national team).
Vexi Salmi, 77, Finnish lyricist ("Huilumies", "Katson sineen taivaan").
Jane Soons, 89, British-born New Zealand geomorphologist.
Yvette Taborin, 91, French archaeologist.
Tony Tanner, 87, British actor (Stop the World – I Want to Get Off) and theatre director (Joseph and the Amazing Technicolor Dreamcoat).
Benedict To Varpin, 84, Papua New Guinean Roman Catholic prelate, Bishop of Bereina (1979–1987) and Archbishop of Madang (1987–2001).
Robert Wilson, 46, American football player (Seattle Seahawks, New Orleans Saints), complications from a stroke.

9
Francisco de Assis Luz Silva, 76, Brazilian footballer (Fluminense, Clube do Remo).
Ronald Bell, 68, American saxophonist (Kool & the Gang) and songwriter ("Ladies' Night", "Celebration").
George Bizos, 92, South African human rights lawyer (Rivonia Trial) and anti-apartheid activist.
Cini Boeri, 96, Italian architect and designer.
Henrietta Boggs, 102, American-Costa Rican author, journalist and activist, First Lady of Costa Rica (1948–1949), subject of First Lady of the Revolution, COVID-19.
Sonny Chua, 52, Malaysian-born Australian composer and pianist, stroke.
Patrick Davin, 58, Belgian orchestra conductor.
Giuseppe Favero, 88, Italian racing cyclist (1954 Milan–San Remo, 1958 Paris–Nice).
KS Firoz, 76, Bangladeshi actor (Chandragrohon), complications from COVID-19.
Arnulfo Fuentebella, 74, Filipino politician, member (1992–2001, 2004–2013, 2016–2019), Deputy Speaker (2007–2013) and Speaker (2000–2001) of the House of Representatives, heart failure.
Chhetan Gurung, 41, Nepalese film director and screenwriter (November Rain, Damaru Ko Dandibiyo), liver disease.
Shere Hite, 77, American-born German feminist and sex educator.
Yopie Latul, 65, Indonesian singer, COVID-19.
Gienek Loska, 45, Belarusian-born Polish singer-songwriter and guitarist, complications from a stroke.
Amos Luzzatto, 92, Italian writer and essayist, President of the Union of Italian Jewish Communities (1998–2006).
Sid McCray, 63, American singer (Bad Brains).
Alan Minter, 69, British boxer, Olympic bronze medallist (1972) and undisputed world middleweight champion (1980), cancer.
Nico Naldini, 91, Italian novelist and poet, complications from a fall.
Jakob Oetama, 88, Indonesian journalist, co-founder of Kompas Gramedia Group and Kompas.
Richard A. Smith, 95, American movie theater executive, CEO of General Cinema Corporation (since 1961).
William D. Smith, 87, American navy admiral.
Tadeusz Szelachowski, 88, Polish politician and physician, Minister of Health and Social Security (1980–1985), vice-chairman of Council of State and MP (1985–1989).
Edgard Tupët-Thomé, 100, French Resistance fighter.
Tony Villars, 68, Welsh footballer (Cardiff City, Newport County, national team).

10
Vadivel Balaji, 45, Indian actor (Yaaruda Mahesh, Kolamavu Kokila) and television personality, complications from a stroke.
Gerald Blidstein, 82, Israeli academic (Ben-Gurion University of the Negev, Israel Academy of Sciences and Humanities).
Mark Bomani, 88, Tanzanian jurist, Attorney General (1965–1976).
Terry Buckle, 80, Canadian Anglican prelate, Archbishop of Yukon (1995–2010), cancer.
Caroline Chomienne, 62, French film director and producer.
Piotr Eberhardt, 84, Polish geographer specialising in demography and geopolitics.
Patti Flynn, 83, Welsh jazz singer, cancer.
Frederick K. Goodwin, 84, American psychiatrist.
Marilyn Kagan, 69, American psychotherapist and actress (Foxes).
Emma Morosini, 96, Italian Roman Catholic pilgrim.
Pierre Nahon, 84, Algerian-born French art collector and gallery owner.
William L. Ogg, 83, American politician.
Melih Onuş, 39, Turkish mathematician, COVID-19.
Florence Pendleton, 94, American politician, U.S. shadow senator (1991–2007).
Pamela L. Reeves, 66, American jurist, Judge (since 2014) and Chief Judge (since 2019) of the U.S. District Court for Eastern Tennessee, cancer.
Franco Maria Ricci, 82, Italian art publisher and magazine editor, heart attack.
Dame Diana Rigg, 82, English actress (The Avengers, On Her Majesty's Secret Service, Game of Thrones), Tony winner (1994), cancer.
Barry Scott, 65, American actor (Ernest Goes to Jail, The Expert) and voice-over artist (Impact Wrestling).
Srećko Štiglić, 77, Croatian Olympic athlete (1972).
Leen van der Waal, 91, Dutch engineer and politician, MEP (1984–1997).
Narong Wongwan, 94, Thai industrialist and politician, Deputy Prime Minister (1992), Leader of the Opposition (1988–1990) and Minister of Agriculture and Cooperatives (1983–1986).
Witold Zapała, 85, Polish dancer and choreographer.

11
Agnivesh, 80, Indian politician and social activist, Haryana MLA (1977–1979) and founder of the Bandhua Mukti Morcha, multiple organ failure.
Sonny Allen, 84, American basketball coach (Old Dominion Monarchs, Nevada Wolf Pack, Sacramento Monarchs), Parkinson's disease.
Marilee Shapiro Asher, 107, American sculptor and author.
Stéphane Caillat, 92, French conductor and composer.
Roger Carel, 93, French actor (Meeting in Paris, Le Plumard en folie, The Umbrella Coup).
Anthony Cekada, 69, American Catholic priest and Sedevacantist, stroke.
Martin J. Dunn, 64, American politician, member of the Massachusetts Senate (1991–1993).
László Gálos, 87, Hungarian Olympic volleyball player (1964).
Bill Heller, 85, American politician, member of the Florida House of Representatives (2007–2011).
Toots Hibbert, 77, Jamaican singer (Toots and the Maytals) and songwriter ("54-46 That's My Number", "Pressure Drop"), COVID-19.
Olaf Holmstrup, 89, Danish Olympic cyclist (1952).
Annette Jahns, 62, German opera singer and director (Semperoper).
Reggie Johnson, 79, American jazz double-bassist.
Henryk Łapiński, 87, Polish actor (How I Unleashed World War II, Man of Marble, A Short Film About Killing).
Grant Larson, 87, American politician, member of the Wyoming Senate (1995–2011).
Christian Manen, 86, French composer.
H. Jay Melosh, 73, American geophysicist.
Tony Opatha, 73, Sri Lankan cricketer (national team).
Peter Paret, 96, German-born American historian.
Angelo Pereni, 76, Italian football player and manager.
Christian Poncelet, 92, French politician, Deputy (1962–1972), member (1977–2008) and President of the Senate (1998–2008).
Nadhim Shaker, 61, Iraqi football player (Al-Tayaran, national team) and manager (Erbil), COVID-19.
Keith Short, 79, English sculptor and visual effects technician (Batman, Raiders of the Lost Ark, The Dark Crystal), stroke.
Lois Stratton, 93, American politician, member of the Washington House of Representatives (1980–1985) and Senate (1985–1993).
Richard William Timm, 97, American Roman Catholic priest, missionary and educator, co-founder of Notre Dame College, Dhaka.
Nicholas Zagone, 89, American politician.
Hans Zoller, 98, Swiss Olympic bobsledder.

12
Navid Afkari, 27, Iranian wrestler, protester (2018 Iranian protests), and convicted murderer, execution by hanging.
Jean-Claude Annaert, 85, French racing cyclist.
Billy Autrey, 87, American football player (Chicago Bears).
Joaquín Carbonell, 73, Spanish singer-songwriter, journalist and poet, COVID-19.
Carlos Casamiquela, 72, Argentine agricultural engineer and public official, Minister of Agriculture (2013–2015) and President of INTA (2009–2013), COVID-19.
Aline Chrétien, 84, Canadian socialite, Spouse of the Prime Minister (1993–2003).
Jean Cluzel, 96, French politician, Senator (1971–1998).
Alberto Collino, 73, Italian mathematician.
Sir Terence Conran, 88, English designer (Habitat) and restaurateur (D&D London).
Bob Crowell, 74, American politician, mayor of Carson City, Nevada (since 2009).
John Fahey, 75, Australian politician, Premier of New South Wales (1992–1995), Minister for Finance (1996–2001), and President of WADA (2008–2013), leukaemia.
Florence Howe, 91, American feminist author, complications from Parkinson's disease.
Barbara Jefford, 90, British actress (Ulysses, Philomena, The Ninth Gate).
Dominique Kalifa, 63, French historian, suicide.
Didier Lapeyronnie, 64, French sociologist.
Mohammed Makhlouf, 87, Syrian businessman, COVID-19.
Azmi Mohamed Megahed, 70, Egyptian Olympic volleyball player (1976), COVID-19.
Jack Roland Murphy, 83, American jewel thief and murderer, heart and organ failure.
Mark Newman, 71, American baseball coach (Old Dominion Monarchs) and executive (New York Yankees).
Linus Okok Okwach, 67, Kenyan Roman Catholic prelate, Bishop of Homa Bay (1993–2002), complications from a fall.
Hugh Routley, 80, Australian footballer (Geelong).
Yousef Saanei, 82, Iranian Twelver Shi'a cleric and politician, member of the Guardian Council (1980–1983), Prosecutor-General (1981–1989), kidney failure.
Katip Şadi, 88, Turkish kemenche player.
Sudhangan, 63, Indian journalist (Kumudam, Vikatan, Dinamani).
Edna Wright, 76, American R&B singer (Honey Cone).

13
Ayo Akinwale, 74, Nigerian actor (The Bridge, Sango).
Sabit Brokaj, 78, Albanian physician and politician, Minister of Health (1991) and Defence (1997–1998), heart attack.
Lillian Brown, 106, American media producer and makeup artist (Dwight D. Eisenhower, Bill Clinton, Martin Luther King Jr.).
Mario Cafiero, 64, Argentine politician, Deputy (1997–2005), cancer.
Ajit Das, 71, Indian actor (Sindura Bindu, Mu Sapanara Soudagar, Luchakali), COVID-19.
Bernard Debré, 75, French politician, Deputy (2012–2017) and Councillor of Paris (since 2008).
John Ferris, 71, American swimmer, Olympic bronze medalist (1968), lung cancer.
Jean Garrabé, 89, French psychiatrist.
Dave Halligan, 61, New Zealand rugby union player (Otago, Auckland).
Lars Idermark, 63, Swedish businessman (PostNord, Swedbank, Kooperativa Förbundet).
Egon Jensen, 82, Danish footballer (Esbjerg, national team).
Bill Johnson, 84, American football player (Tennessee Volunteers).
György Keleti, 74, Hungarian military officer and politician, Minister of Defence (1994–1998) and MP (1992–2010).
Said Ali Kemal, 81–82, Comorian politician, Member of the Assembly of the Union of the Comoros (2004–2010).
Paolo Knill, 88, Swiss scientist.
Joe Lawson, 86, Australian footballer (Swan Districts).
André Lespagnol, 77, French politician, President of the Regional Council of Brittany (2004–2010).
Bruno Madaule, 49, French comic book author.
Russ Meekins Jr., 71, American politician, member of the Alaska House of Representatives (1973–1975, 1977–1983).
Zameer Akhtar Naqvi, 76, Indian-born Pakistani Islamic scholar, heart attack.
Parrerito, 67, Brazilian singer, COVID-19.
Don Piccard, 94, Swiss-born American balloonist.
Günter Siegmund, 83, German heavyweight boxer, Olympic bronze medalist (1960).
Raghuvansh Prasad Singh, 74, Indian politician, Minister of Rural Development (2004–2009) and MP (1996–2014), complications from COVID-19.
Alan Smurfit, 77, Irish poker player.
K. Thangavel, 68, Indian politician, Tamil Nadu MLA (2011–2016), COVID-19.

14
Sei Ashina, 36, Japanese actress (Kamen Rider Hibiki, Silk, Kamui Gaiden), suicide.
Sadek Bachchu, 66, Bangladeshi actor (Super Hero, Nissash Amar Tumi), COVID-19.
Cynthia Barker, 58, Filipino-born British politician, Mayor of Hertsmere (since 2015).
Robert Chabbal, 93, French physician, Director General of the French National Centre for Scientific Research (1976–1979).
Petko Christov, 69, Bulgarian Roman Catholic prelate, Bishop of Nicopolis (since 1994).
François Debré, 78, French writer and journalist.
Council Julian Dunbar Jr., 98, American politician, member of the South Carolina House of Representatives (1971–1972).
Jeff Dunne, 64, Australian footballer (St Kilda), heart attack.
Enrique Ramón Fajarnés, 91, Spanish lawyer and politician, Mayor of Ibiza (1971–1974), Senator (1982–1986) and Deputy (1986–1993).
Fer, 71, Spanish comics artist.
Ralph Gants, 65, American jurist, Associate Justice (2009–2014) and Chief Justice (since 2014) of the Massachusetts Supreme Judicial Court, heart attack.
Bill Gates Sr., 94, American attorney and philanthropist, complications from Alzheimer's disease.
Bruce Goodwin, 71, American politician, member of the Ohio House of Representatives (2007–2012), multiple myeloma.
André Guesdon, 71, French football player (Monaco, Nice) and manager (Angers).
Al Kasha, 83, American songwriter ("Operation Heartbreak", "The Morning After", "We May Never Love Like This Again"), Oscar winner (1973, 1975).
Alicia Maguiña, 81, Peruvian singer and composer.
Oh In-hye, 36, South Korean actress, suicide.
Benedicta de Oliveira, 92, Brazilian Olympic sprinter (1948).
Florent Pereira, 67, Indian actor (Kayal, Nagesh Thiraiyarangam, Utraan), COVID-19.
Sarah Poyntz, 93, Irish journalist and author, cancer.
Dennis Sommers, 80, American baseball player (Cleveland Indians, San Diego Padres, New York Mets).
Daniel Soulage, 78, French politician, Deputy (1993–1997) and Senator (2001–2011).
Andrzej Stalmach, 78, Polish Olympic long jumper (1964, 1968).
Peter Starkie, 72, Australian rock guitarist (Skyhooks, Jo Jo Zep & The Falcons), fall.
Anne Stevenson, 87, American-British poet, heart failure.
Roy Williams, 93, Canadian Olympic basketball player.
Mack Yoho, 84, American football player (Buffalo Bills, Ottawa Rough Riders).

15
Vital Alsar, 87, Spanish sailor and scientist.
Faith Alupo, 36, Ugandan politician, MP (since 2018), COVID-19.
Russell A. Anderson, 78, American jurist, Associate Justice (1998–2006) and Chief Justice (2006–2008) of the Minnesota Supreme Court.
Aloysio de Andrade Faria, 99, Brazilian banker, founder of Banco Real.
Edward D. Baca, 82, American lieutenant general, leukemia.
Stephen B. Baxter, 91, American historian.
Ed Bearss, 97, American military historian and author.
Steve Carter, 90, American playwright (Eden, Nevis Mountain Dew, Dame Lorraine).
Davis A. Donnelly, 93, American politician.
Fatima Gallaire, 76, Algerian playwright.
Johnny Gayle, 96, Jamaican cricket umpire.
Sheldon Gomes, 69, Trinidadian cricketer (North Trinidad, East Trinidad, national team).
James "T" Jones, 89, American football player (Texas Longhorns) and athletic director (Texas Tech Red Raiders).
Suna Kıraç, 79, Turkish-American businesswoman, complications from amyotrophic lateral sclerosis.
Danilo Kocevski, 73, Macedonian literary critic and novelist.
Momčilo Krajišnik, 75, Bosnian politician and convicted war criminal, Member of the Presidency (1996–1998) and Speaker of the NSRS (1991–1996), COVID-19.
Jan Krenz, 94, Polish composer and conductor.
Paul Méfano, 83, Iraqi-born French composer and conductor.
Denise Murray, 56, Canadian country singer.
Sadashiv Patil, 86, Indian cricketer (Maharashtra, national team).
Nikolay Shmatko, 77, Ukrainian sculptor and painter.
Yasin Mazhar Siddiqui, 75, Indian Islamic scholar.
Pat Smullen, 43, Irish jockey, pancreatic cancer.
Péter Tereánszki-Tóth, 39, Hungarian footballer (Videoton).
Mario Torelli, 83, Italian archaeologist.
Moussa Traoré, 83, Malian military officer and politician, President (1968–1991).
Floyd Vrtiska, 93, American politician, member of the Nebraska Legislature (1993–2005).
Wang Zhiliang, 79, Chinese table tennis player, world champion (1963), stroke.
Brien S. Wygle, 96, American aviator and test pilot (Boeing).

16
B. Babusivan, 54, Indian film director (Vettaikaaran) and screenwriter (Kuruvi, Bairavaa), liver failure.
Ahmed Ben Salah, 94, Tunisian politician, Minister of Finance (1961–1969).
Chea Cheapoo, 77, Liberian politician and judge, chief justice (1987).
Edward M. Coffman, 91, American military historian.
Stanley Crouch, 74, American music critic, novelist, and poet.
William Henry Danforth, 94, American physician and academic administrator, chancellor of Washington University in St. Louis (1971–1995).
Núria Gispert i Feliu, 84, Spanish politician, Catholic activist and social worker, City Councillor of Barcelona (1979–1995), colon cancer.
Alien Huang, 36, Taiwanese singer, actor (Already Famous, Din Tao: Leader of the Parade) and television presenter (100% Entertainment), aortic dissection.
Enrique Irazoqui, 76, Spanish actor (The Gospel According to St. Matthew).
Jack Kelley, 93, American ice hockey coach (New England Whalers) and team executive (Pittsburgh Penguins).
Anna Kędzierska, 88, Polish politician, economist and party activist, Minister of Internal Trade and Service (1984–1985).
P. R. Krishna Kumar, 68, Indian ayurvedic physician, founder of the AVP Research Foundation, COVID-19.
Apolonio Lombardo, 86, Panamanian footballer (national team).
Maxim Martsinkevich, 36, Russian political activist, leader of Format18 and founder of Occupy Pedophilia.
Kay McIff, 80, American politician.
Nick Mourouzis, 83, American football player (Miami RedHawks) and coach (DePauw Tigers), complications from COVID-19.
Balli Durga Prasad Rao, 64, Indian politician, MP (since 2019) and Andhra Pradesh MLA (1985–1989, 1994–1999, 2009–2014), COVID-19.
David Rawson, 79, American diplomat, ambassador to Rwanda (1993–1996) and Mali (1996–1999).
Roy C, 81, American southern soul singer-songwriter ("Impeach the President").
Saefullah, 56, Indonesian politician, Mayor of Central Jakarta (2010–2014) and Regional Secretary of Jakarta (since 2014), COVID-19-induced septic shock and ARDS.
Elsa Serrano, 79, Italian-born Argentinian fashion designer, asphyxiation due to fire.
Doak Snead, 70, American singer-songwriter.
Francisco Trois, 74, Brazilian chess player, diabetes.
Kapila Vatsyayan, 91, Indian classical scholar, MP (2006–2012).

17
Hassan Achour, 82, Algerian football player (CR Belouizdad, national team) and manager (Chéraga).
Jimoh Aliu, 80, Nigerian actor.
Daniel Charles-Alfred, 86, French footballer (Nîmes Olympique, Montpellier).
Ricardo Ciciliano, 43, Colombian footballer (Deportes Tolima, Millonarios, Juan Aurich), pneumonia.
Irma Dryden, 100, American nurse (Tuskegee Airmen).
Donald Keith Duncan, 80, Jamaican politician, MP (1976–1983, 2007–2016), COVID-19.
Birger Folke, 84, Swedish tennis player and television commentator.
Ashok Gasti, 55, Indian politician, MP (since 2020), COVID-19.
Terry Goodkind, 72, American author (The Sword of Truth, The Law of Nines).
Robert W. Gore, 83, American engineer, philanthropist and inventor.
Winston Groom, 77, American novelist (Forrest Gump), heart attack.
Reg Harrison, 97, English football player (Derby County, Boston United) and manager (Long Eaton United).
Harvey Hodder, 77, Canadian politician, Newfoundland and Labrador MHA (1993–2007), cancer.
Miao Chunting, 101, Chinese politician, Guizhou CPPCC Committee Chairman (1959–1967, 1980–1993).
Luboš Perek, 101, Czech astronomer.
Joe Ruklick, 82, American basketball player (Philadelphia Warriors).
Alwi Shahab, 84, Indonesian journalist (Republika), pneumonia.
Pir Hameeduddin Sialvi, 84, Pakistani politician, Senator (1988–1994).
László Török, 79, Hungarian historian and archaeologist.
Liladhar Vaghela, 85, Indian politician, MP (2014–2019) and Gujarat MLA (1975–1980, 1985–1995, 1998–2002, 2007–2014), respiratory failure.
Larry Wilson, 82, American Hall of Fame football player (St. Louis Cardinals), coach and executive.

18
Mohamad Atwi, 32, Lebanese footballer (Ansar, Akhaa Ahli Aley, national team), complications from gunshot wounds.
Asit Bandopadhyay, 84, Indian dramatist, screenwriter and actor (Mahaprithibi), COVID-19.
Talat Basari, 97, Iranian Baháʼí poet, feminist, academic, and writer.
Stephen F. Cohen, 81, American academic and historian, lung cancer.
Don Feeley, 82, American college basketball coach (Sacred Heart, Fairleigh Dickinson).
Ruth Bader Ginsburg, 87, American jurist, Associate Justice of the U.S. Supreme Court (since 1993) and Judge of the D.C. Cir. (1980–1993), complications from pancreatic cancer.
Enzo Golino, 88, Italian journalist and writer.
A. Kalanithi, Indian politician, MP (1980–1988), cardiac arrest.
Joachim Kunert, 90, German film director and screenwriter.
Sam McBratney, 77, Northern Irish author (Guess How Much I Love You).
Anacleto de Oliveira, 74, Portuguese Roman Catholic prelate, Bishop of Viana do Castelo (since 2010), traffic collision.
Awang anak Raweng, 91, Malaysian military officer.
Amélie Rorty, 88, Belgian-born American philosopher.
Shah Ahmad Shafi, 104, Bangladeshi Islamic scholar, Rector of the Hathazari Madrassah (1986–2020) and Chairman of the Befaqul Madarisil Arabia Bangladesh.
Mike Tilleman, 76, American football player (New Orleans Saints, Atlanta Falcons, Houston Oilers).
Marcel Trillat, 80, French journalist and filmmaker.

19
David Cook, 76, Northern Irish politician, MPA (1982–1986) and Lord Mayor of Belfast (1978–1979), COVID-19.
Roza Vidyadhar Deshpande, 91, Indian politician, MP (1971–1977).
J. Delano Ellis, 75, American Pentecostal clergyman.
Károly Fatér, 80, Hungarian footballer, Olympic champion (1968).
Yutakayama Hiromitsu, 72, Japanese sumo wrestler.
Gary Hughes, 79, American baseball executive (Chicago Cubs, Florida Marlins, New York Yankees), cancer.
Donald M. Kendall, 99, American food and beverage executive and political advisor, CEO of PepsiCo (1971–1986).
Lee Kerslake, 73, English drummer (Uriah Heep, Ozzy Osbourne, Toe Fat), prostate cancer.
Al Langlois, 85, Canadian ice hockey player (Montreal Canadiens, New York Rangers, Detroit Red Wings), Stanley Cup champion (1958-1960).
Richard Lewis, 76, British Anglican prelate, Bishop of St Edmundsbury and Ipswich (1997–2007).
Dame Georgina Mace, 67, British ecologist and conservation scientist.
Ephrem M'Bom, 66, Cameroonian footballer (Canon Yaoundé, national team).
Darvin Moon, 56, American poker player, complications from surgery.
Dick Nemelka, 76, American basketball player (BYU Cougars, Utah Stars), cancer.
Mary O'Malley, 79, English playwright (Once a Catholic).
Andrzej Pitynski, 73, Polish-American monumental sculptor (Katyń Memorial, The Partisans).
Jean-Pierre Pophillat, 83, French painter and lithographer.
Janez Puterle, 70, Slovenian ice hockey player.
Charles E. Schaefer, 86, American psychologist.
Tara Singh, 82, Indian politician, Maharashtra MLA (1999–2019).
John Turner, 91, Canadian politician, Prime Minister (1984), Minister of Justice (1968–1972) and Finance (1972–1975), and MP (1962–1976, 1984–1993).

20
Uktam Barnoev, 56, Uzbek politician and agricultural engineer, Deputy Prime Minister (2020), COVID-19.
Meron Benvenisti, 86, Israeli political scientist, Deputy Mayor of Jerusalem (1971–1978).
Ken Blaiklock, 92, British Antarctic explorer.
James A. Boucher, 83, American politician.
Michael Chapman, 84, American cinematographer (Taxi Driver, Raging Bull, The Fugitive) and film director, heart failure.
Robert Graetz, 92, American clergyman and civil rights activist (Montgomery bus boycott).
Shehu Idris, 84, Nigerian aristocrat, Emir of Zazzau (since 1975).
Sir Malcolm Innes of Edingight, 82, Scottish herald, Lord Lyon King of Arms of Scotland (1981–2001), cancer.
Keith Jobling, 86, English football player (Grimsby Town) and manager (Boston United).
Knut Kloster, 91, Norwegian shipping magnate, co-founder of Norwegian Cruise Line.
Blanche M. Manning, 85, American jurist, Judge of the U.S. District Court for Northern Illinois (since 1994).
Caroline Mortimer, 78, British actress (The Death of Adolf Hitler, The Pallisers), leukaemia.
Dan Olweus, 89, Swedish-Norwegian psychologist.
Rosa María Ortiz, 65, Peruvian lawyer and politician, Minister of Energy and Mines (2015–2016).
Walter Owens, 87, American baseball player.
Marian Packham, 92, Canadian biochemist.
Garland F. Pinholster, 92, American college basketball coach (Oglethorpe) and politician, member of the Georgia House of Representatives (1991–2003).
Mary Pruitt, 86, American politician, member of the Tennessee House of Representatives (1985–2013), blood clot as a result of a fall.
Rossana Rossanda, 96, Italian politician and journalist, Deputy (1963–1968) and co-founder of Il manifesto.
Moshe Sharoni, 91, Israeli politician, member of the Knesset (2006–2009).
Alan Tomkins, 81, British art director (The Empire Strikes Back, Saving Private Ryan, Batman Begins).
Richard Turner-Warwick, 95, British urologist.
Gerardo Vera, 73, Spanish costume designer (El Amor brujo), film director (La Celestina, Second Skin) and actor, COVID-19.

21
Jaime Alves, 55, Portuguese footballer (Boavista, Vitória de Guimarães, national team).
Arthur Ashkin, 98, American scientist, Nobel Prize laureate (2018).
Hamdi Benani, 77, Algerian musician and singer, COVID-19.
Virginio Bettini, 78, Italian politician, MEP (1989–1994).
Giuseppe Caldarola, 74, Italian journalist and politician, Deputy (2001–2008).
Julián Cardona, 59–60, Mexican photojournalist.
Ron Cobb, 83, American-Australian editorial cartoonist and prop and set designer (Star Wars, Back to the Future, Conan the Barbarian), Lewy body dementia.
Tommy DeVito, 92, American Hall of Fame musician and singer (The Four Seasons), COVID-19.
Roy Head, 79, American singer ("Treat Her Right"), heart attack.
Lars-Åke Lagrell, 80, Swedish sports personality, Governor of Kronoberg County (2002–2006).
Amos Lin, 87, Israeli Olympic basketball player (1952).
Michael Lonsdale, 89, British-French actor (The Day of the Jackal, Moonraker, The Remains of the Day).
Gilbert Meyer, 78, French politician, Deputy (1993–2007) and mayor of Colmar (1995–2020).
Claude Moisy, 93, French journalist and writer, President of the Agence France-Presse (1990–1993).
Jacques-Louis Monod, 93, French composer and pianist.
Roger R. Moore, 98, American politician.
John Meirion Morris, 84, Welsh sculptor.
Harold Moss, 90, American politician, mayor of Tacoma, Washington (1994–1996).
Bob Nevin, 82, Canadian ice hockey player (Toronto Maple Leafs, New York Rangers, Edmonton Oilers), Stanley Cup champion (1962, 1963).
Phil O'Keefe, 71, British geographer, cancer.
Brian Peterson, 83, South African footballer (Blackpool, Durban United, Durban City).
Bryndís Pétursdóttir, 92, Icelandic actress. 
Mykola Polyakov, 74, Ukrainian scientist, rector of Oles Honchar Dnipro National University (since 1998).
K. V. Shanthi, 83, Indian actress (Chori Chori, Madhuvidhu, Devi Kanyakumari).
Shyama Sharma, 70, Indian politician, Himachal Pradesh MLA, COVID-19.
Ang Rita Sherpa, 72, Nepalese mountaineer, complications from a stroke.
Bob Smith, 89, American politician, member of the U.S. House of Representatives (1983–1995, 1997–1999).
Jackie Stallone, 98, American astrologer.
Ira Sullivan, 89, American jazz trumpeter, metastatic pancreatic cancer.
Wan Mokhtar Ahmad, 88, Malaysian politician, Menteri Besar of Terengganu (1974–1999) and Terengganu State MLA (1974–1999), heart disease.
Sune Wehlin, 97, Swedish Olympic modern pentathlete (1948).
Bobby Wilson, 84, English tennis player.

22
Bob Atkins, 74, American football player (Houston Oilers, St. Louis Cardinals).
Neil Brannon, 79, American politician, member of the Oklahoma House of Representatives (2002–2010).
Rajendra Devlekar, 54, Indian politician, mayor of Kalyan-Dombivli (2015–2018), COVID-19.
Mary Gergen, 81, American social psychologist.
Michael Gwisdek, 78, German actor and film director (Treffen in Travers, The Big Mambo).
Bob Ingham, 88, Australian poultry magnate (Inghams Enterprises), philanthropist and racehorse breeder.
Jon Hui-jong, 90, North Korean politician and diplomat, member of the Central Committee of the WPK (1980–2016), SPA (1982–1998).
Sergey Khoruzhiy, 78, Russian theoretical physicist, philosopher and translator (Ulysses).
Frie Leysen, 70, Belgian festival director.
Li Dongying, 99, Chinese metallurgist.
Ashutosh Mohunta, 67, Indian jurist, Acting Chief Justice of the Punjab and Haryana High Court (2014) and member of the PSHRC (since 2016), COVID-19.
Jacques Senard, 100, French diplomat.
Gopal Singh Rawat, Indian politician, Uttarakhand MLA (2012–2017), COVID-19.
Dudley Riggs, 88, American improvisational comedian.
Road Warrior Animal, 60, American Hall of Fame professional wrestler (NWA, WWF, AJPW), heart attack.
Adamu Daramani Sakande, 58, Ghanaian politician, MP (2009–2013).
Agne Simonsson, 84, Swedish football player (Örgryte, national team) and manager (Iraklis), pneumonia.
Mark Snyder, 74, American politician.
Soraya Santiago Solla, 72, Puerto Rican transgender pioneer. 
Andre Vltchek, 57, Russian-born American political analyst, journalist and filmmaker, complications from diabetes.
Ashalata Wabgaonkar, 79, Indian actress (Ankush, Ahista Ahista, Yaadon Ki Kasam), COVID-19.

23
Vakha Agaev, 67, Russian politician, Deputy (since 2011), COVID-19.
Yvette Alloo, 90, Belgian table tennis player, Paralympic gold medalist (1960, 1964).
Suresh Angadi, 65, Indian politician, Minister of State for Railways (since 2019) and MP (since 2004), COVID-19.
Ray Batten, 75, English rugby league player (Leeds Rhinos, national team) and coach (Wakefield Trinity).
Charles Stuart Bowyer, 86, American astronomer, complications from COVID-19.
Eric Bransby, 103, American artist.
David K. Cohen, 86, American educational researcher.
François Diederich, 68, Luxembourgian chemist, cancer.
Arthur A. Dugoni, 95, American dentist.
Sir Harold Evans, 92, British-American journalist (The Sunday Times, The Week, The Guardian), and author, heart failure.
Renée Fox, 92, American sociologist, leukemia.
Toomas Frey, 82, Estonian ecologist, geobotanist and forest scientist.
Juliette Gréco, 93, French actress (The Sun Also Rises, Belphegor, or Phantom of the Louvre, The Night of the Generals) and singer.
Guitar Crusher, 89, American blues singer and guitarist.
W. S. Holland, 85, American drummer (The Tennessee Three).
Zlatko Portner, 58, Serbian handball player, Olympic bronze medalist (1988).
Krishna Chandra Punetha, Indian politician, Uttarakhand MLA.
Brenda Robertson, 91, Canadian politician, Senator (1984–2004) and New Brunswick MLA (1967–1984).
Erich Romauch, 81, Austrian Olympic ice hockey player (1964).
Gale Sayers, 77, American Hall of Fame football player (Chicago Bears) and administrator (Southern Illinois), characterized in Brian's Song, complications from dementia.
Steve Smith, 68, American Olympic pole vaulter (1972).
Laurie Smith Camp, 66, American jurist, Judge (since 2001) and Chief Judge (2011–2018) of the U.S. District Court for Nebraska.
Leo Sugar, 91, American football player (Chicago/St. Louis Cardinals, Philadelphia Eagles, Detroit Lions).
Eddie Thomas, 87, English footballer (Southampton, Salisbury City).
Pierre Troisgros, 92, French restaurateur.
G. P. Venkidu, 85, Indian politician, Tamil Nadu MLA (1996–2001), COVID-19.
Iván Verebély, 82, Hungarian actor, voice actor (The Boy in the Striped Pyjamas).

24
Sekhar Basu, 68, Indian nuclear scientist, Chairman of the Atomic Energy Commission (2015–2018) and director of BARC (2012–2016), COVID-19.
Robert Bechtle, 88, American painter, Lewy body dementia.
Jaime Blanco García, 76, Spanish politician, President of Cantabria (1990–1991).
Colette Giudicelli, 76, French politician, Senator (since 2008).
Arnold Goldberg, 91, American psychiatrist and psychoanalyst.
Capistrano Francisco Heim, 86, American-born Brazilian Roman Catholic prelate, Territorial Prelate of Itaituba (1988–2010).
Keith Hufnagel, 46, American skateboarder, brain cancer.
Dean Jones, 59, Australian cricket player (Victoria, Derbyshire, national team) and commentator, stroke.
John Walter Jones, 74, Welsh civil servant, Chief Executive of the Welsh Language Board (1993–2004).
Max Merritt, 79, New Zealand musician ("Slipping Away"), Goodpasture syndrome.
Derland Moore, 68, American football player (New Orleans Saints, New York Jets).
John J. Myers, 79, American Roman Catholic prelate, Bishop of Peoria (1990–2001), Ecclesiastical Superior of Turks and Caicos (2001–2016) and Archbishop of Newark (2001–2016).
Paul Pettit, 88, American baseball player (Pittsburgh Pirates).
Robert Poydasheff, 90, American politician, Mayor of Columbus, Georgia (2003–2007).
B. Narayan Rao, 65, Indian politician, Karnataka MLA (since 2018), COVID-19.
Bertram Richardson, 88, English cricketer (Derbyshire).
Corine Rottschäfer, 82, Dutch model and beauty pageant winner (Miss World 1959).
Gerhard Weber, 79, German fashion designer and retail executive (Gerry Weber).
Zhang Xinshi, 86, Chinese plant ecologist.

25
S. P. Balasubrahmanyam, 74, Indian playback singer ("Didi Tera Devar Deewana") and actor (Maya, Mayabazar), complications from COVID-19.
James P. Carse, 87, American academic, heart failure.
Frans Derks, 89, Dutch football referee and executive (Dordrecht).
Peter Hampton, 66, English footballer (Leeds United, Stoke City, Burnley).
Christine Hunt, 70, Australian Olympic javelin thrower (1976).
Johann Löser, 83, Austrian football player (Austria Wien) and manager (SV Stockerau).
Bernard Madrelle, 76, French politician, Deputy (1978–2007), mayor of Saint-Seurin-de-Cursac (1983–1989) and Blaye (1989–2008), liver cancer.
Keith McGuinness, 87, Australian footballer (South Melbourne).
Jerry Oliver, 89, American basketball coach (Indiana Hoosiers, Indiana Pacers).
Viktor Panin, 89, Russian physicist.
Goran Paskaljević, 73, Serbian film director (The Dog Who Loved Trains, Special Treatment, How Harry Became a Tree).
Matt Ratana, 54, New Zealand-born British police officer, shot.
Conrad Roland, 86, German architect.
George Sayliss, 89, Canadian ice hockey player (East York Lyndhursts).
Simos Simopoulos, Greek politician, Minister of Infrastructure and Transport (2012) and Rector of National Technical University of Athens (2010–2014).
Jeanne Valérie, 79, French actress.

26
Isher Judge Ahluwalia, 74, Indian economist, brain cancer.
José Antonio Arbesú, 80, Cuban diplomat, cancer.
John D. Barrow, 67, English cosmologist, theoretical physicist and mathematician, colon cancer.
Erik Bartnes, 80, Norwegian politician, county mayor of Nord-Trøndelag (2003–2007).
Almontaser Bellah, 70, Egyptian actor.
John Bernhagen, 86, American politician.
Jacques Beurlet, 75, Belgian footballer (Standard Liège, national team).
Greg Brown, 63, American football player (Philadelphia Eagles, Atlanta Falcons).
Ernest Carl Castle, 93, American Navy captain.
Mark Cousins, 72, British cultural critic and architectural theorist.
Dai Yuanben, 92, Chinese physicist, member of the Chinese Academy of Sciences.
Sir Geoffrey Dalton, 89, British vice admiral, Deputy Supreme Allied Commander Atlantic (1984–1987).
Moshe Efrati, 86, Israeli choreographer.
Norman Gorbaty, 87, American artist.
Abdul Mahdi Hadi, 74, Iraqi footballer (Al-Mina'a, national team) and manager (Al-Mina'a), COVID-19.
Jay Johnstone, 74, American baseball player (Los Angeles Dodgers, Chicago Cubs, New York Yankees) and commentator, World Series champion (1978, 1981), complications from COVID-19.
Masayoshi Kabe, 70, Japanese bassist and guitarist (The Golden Cups, Speed, Glue & Shinki, Vodka Collins), multiple organ failure.
John K. McNulty, 85, American legal scholar.
Rebecca Morton, 56, American political scientist.
Hal Raether, 87, American baseball player (Philadelphia/Kansas City Athletics).
Nasser Sebaggala, 72, Ugandan politician, mayor of Kampala (1998–1999, 2006–2011), intussusception.
Adele Stolte, 87, German soprano singer.
Denis Tillinac, 73, French writer and journalist.
Leo Traister, 101, American college football coach (Eureka College Red Devils).
Suzanne Tremblay, 83, Canadian politician, MP (1993–2004), Opposition House Leader (1997), cancer.
Szabolcs Udvari, 46, Hungarian footballer (Szeged LC, Békéscsaba 1912 Előre, Budapest Honvéd).
Nicolas Wildhaber, 90, Swiss Olympic swimmer and LEN official.
Jimmy Winston, 75, English musician (Small Faces) and actor (Doctor Who).

27
Mahbubey Alam, 71, Bangladeshi jurist, Attorney General (since 2009), COVID-19.
Kevin Burns, 65, American film and television producer (Ancient Aliens, Lost in Space, Poseidon), cardiac arrest.
Rose Mary Hatem Bonsack, 86, American politician, member of the Maryland House of Delegates (1991–1999).
Kenneth E. Calvert, 91, American politician.
Wolfgang Clement, 80, German politician, Minister for Economics and Labour (2002–2005) and Minister-President of North Rhine-Westphalia (1998–2002), lung cancer.
Kevin Lewis, 72, Australian cricketer (South Australia).
Mario Luis Bautista Maulión, 85, Argentine Roman Catholic prelate, Archbishop of Paraná (2003–2010).
Yuri Orlov, 96, Russian-born American nuclear physicist, political dissident and human rights activist, founder of the Moscow Helsinki Group.
Barclay Palmer, 88, English Olympic shot putter (1956).
Susan Ryan, 77, Australian politician and public servant, Senator (1975–1987), Minister for Education (1983–1987) and Age Discrimination Commissioner (2011–2016).
Jaswant Singh, 82, Indian politician, Minister of Finance (1996, 2002–2004), Defence (2000–2001) and External Affairs (1998–2002), multiple organ failure.
Yuko Takeuchi, 40, Japanese actress (Ring, Miss Sherlock, FlashForward), hanging.
C. F. Thomas, 81, Indian politician, Kerala MLA (since 1980).
Kōsei Tomita, 84, Japanese voice actor (Doraemon, Tensai Bakabon, Mazinger Z), stroke.
Ivo Vykydal, 55, Czech politician, Deputy (2002–2006).
John Waddy, 100, British Army officer, Colonel SAS (1964–1967).
Tjalling Waterbolk, 96, Dutch archaeologist.

28
Robert Adair, 96, American physicist.
G. S. Amur, 95, Indian literary critic and writer.
Rubén Anguiano, 64, Mexican footballer (Zacatepec, Atlante, national team), COVID-19.
Doug Brinham, 86, Canadian Olympic basketball player (1956).
Bruce Bronzan, 73, American politician, member of the California State Assembly (1982–1993).
Dee Cannon, 58, British acting coach (Cynthia Erivo, Colin Firth, Tom Hiddleston), lymphoma.
Lodwrick Cook, 92, American businessman and philanthropist.
Tennyson Cooray, 68, Sri Lankan actor (Re Daniel Dawal Migel, Cheriyo, Somy Boys), cardiac arrest.
Gene Corman, 93, American film producer and agent.
Jackie Dennis, 77, Scottish singer.
Frédéric Devreese, 91, Belgian composer (Benvenuta, The Cruel Embrace).
Jacqueline Diffring, 100, German-British sculptor.
Laurie Fagan, 79, Australian rugby player (Balmain Tigers, Penrith Panthers).
Ronald Forfar, 81, English actor (Bread). 
Juan Carlos Guerra Zunzunegui, 85, Spanish lawyer and politician, Senator (1977–1986) and Deputy (1986–2008).
Peter Jutzeler, 80, Swiss Olympic wrestler (1964, 1968).
Paul Moore, 61, British banker and whistleblower, colitis.
Maynard Solomon, 90, American music producer and biographer.
Anwara Taimur, 83, Indian politician, Chief Minister of Assam (1980–1981), MP (1988–1990, 2004–2010) and Assam MLA (1972–1985, 1991–1996).
Joy A. Thomas, 57, Indian-born American information theorist.
Hiroki Yuhara, 36, Japanese rugby union player (Toshiba Brave Lupus).

29
Abd al-Rahman Abd al-Khaliq, 80, Egyptian-Kuwaiti Islamic scholar and preacher, heart attack.
Luigi Arisio, 94, Italian politician and union worker, Deputy (1983–1987).
Silva Batuta, 80, Brazilian footballer (Flamengo, Corinthians, national team).
Aster Berkhof, 100, Belgian author.
Tom Blake, 93, American football player (New York Bulldogs).
Timothy Ray Brown, 54, American considered the first person cured of HIV/AIDS, leukemia.
Rebecca Cryer, 73, American attorney and tribal judge, COVID-19.
János Dalmati, 78, Hungarian Olympic athlete (1972).
Mac Davis, 78, American singer-songwriter ("Baby, Don't Get Hooked on Me", "It's Hard to Be Humble") and actor (North Dallas Forty), complications from heart surgery.
Robert Eighteen-Bisang, 72-73, Canadian author and scholar of vampire literature.
Mamu Ram Gonder, 70, Indian politician, Haryana MLA (2009–2014), post-COVID-19 complications.
Rocco Prestia, 69, American bassist (Tower of Power).
Phillip Rebbeck, 72, Australian cricketer (South Australia).
Helen Reddy, 78, Australian-American singer ("I Am Woman", "Delta Dawn") and actress (Pete's Dragon), Grammy winner (1973).
Doyle Royal, 101, American college soccer and tennis coach (Maryland).
Sabah Al-Ahmad Al-Jaber Al-Sabah, 91, Kuwaiti royal, Emir (since 2006) and Prime Minister (2003–2006).
Mirza Shahi, 88–89, Pakistani actor (Chakori), complications from COVID-19.
KC Sivasankaran, 96, Indian artist.
Carlisle Trost, 90, American Navy admiral, Chief of Naval Operations (1986–1990).
Ania Walwicz, 68–69, Polish-born Australian poet, playwright and visual artist.
John Whittaker, 70, New Zealand rugby league player (Warrington, Wellington, national team), cancer.
Isidora Žebeljan, 53, Serbian composer and conductor.

30
Ali Bozer, 95, Turkish politician and academic, Acting Prime Minister (1989) and Minister of Foreign Affairs (1990), COVID-19.
Jacques Brunhes, 85, French politician, Deputy (1978–2007).
Simon Eine, 84, French actor (Another Man, Another Chance, Notre musique, Sarah's Key).
Burnham Hodgson, 94, English archdeacon.
Emyr Humphreys, 101, Welsh novelist (A Toy Epic) and poet.
John Jenkins, 68, American politician, member of the Maine Senate (1996–1998), mayor of Lewiston (1994–1998) and Auburn, Maine (2007–2009).
Pia Juul, 58, Danish poet.
Homer Kent, 94, American theologian.
Romain Bruno Légaré, 95, French missionary.
Scott Lilienfeld, 59, American psychologist and author (50 Great Myths of Popular Psychology), pancreatic cancer.
Mai Chia-je, 33, Taiwanese baseball player (Brother Elephants), traffic collision.
Vittorio Mathieu, 96, Italian philosopher.
Leonard Mastroni, 71, American politician, member of the Kansas House of Representatives (since 2017).
Ken McKim, 95, Canadian football player (Toronto Argonauts, Saskatchewan Roughriders).
Bob Miller, 64, American Olympic ice hockey player (Boston Bruins, Los Angeles Kings, national team).
Guy Natusch, 99, New Zealand architect.
Viktor Nikitin, 59, Russian writer, playwright and editor, complications from COVID-19.
Ardeth Platte, 84, American Dominican nun and anti-war activist.
Quino, 88, Argentine-Spanish cartoonist (Mafalda), stroke.
Rinaldo Ruatti, 90, Italian Olympic bobsledder (1968), world champion (1962).
Eli Ruckenstein, 95, Romanian-born American physical chemist.
John Russell, 100, American Hall of Fame equestrian, Olympic bronze medalist (1952).
Ananta Charan Sukla, 77, Indian literary scholar, multiple organ failure.
Frank Windsor, 92, English actor (Z-Cars, Softly, Softly, EastEnders).

References

2020-09
 09